The 2017 Coca-Cola Firecracker 250 was the 15th stock car race of the 2017 NASCAR Xfinity Series season and the 16th iteration of the event. The race was held on Saturday, June 30, 2017, Daytona Beach, Florida, at Daytona International Speedway, a 2.5 miles (4.08 km) permanent triangular-shaped superspeedway. Due to inclement weather, the remainder of the race was held on July 1. The race was extended from 100 laps to 104 laps, due to a NASCAR overtime finish. At race's end, William Byron, driving for JR Motorsports, scored his second win in a row after leading the race when the caution came out with two to go. It was Byron's second career win in the xfinity series. He would also become the youngest winner in Daytona history, being only 19-years old. To fill out the podium, Elliott Sadler of JR Motorsports and Dakoda Armstrong of JGL Racing would finish second and third, respectively.

Background 

The race was held at Daytona International Speedway, which is a race track in Daytona Beach, Florida, United States. Since opening in 1959, it has been the home of the Daytona 500, the most prestigious race in NASCAR as well as its season opening event. In addition to NASCAR, the track also hosts races of ARCA, AMA Superbike, IMSA, SCCA, and Motocross. The track's  infield includes the  Lake Lloyd, which has hosted powerboat racing. The speedway is operated by NASCAR pursuant to a lease with the City of Daytona Beach on the property that runs until 2054.

Entry list 

 (R) denotes rookie driver.
 (i) denotes driver who is ineligible for series driver points.

Practice

First practice 
The first practice session was held on Thursday, June 29, at 2:00 PM EST. The session would last for 55 minutes.

Final practice 
The final practice session was held on Thursday, June 29, at 4:00 PM EST. The session would last for 55 minutes.

Qualifying 
Qualifying was held on Friday, June 30, at 2:10 PM EST. Since Daytona International Speedway is at least , the qualifying system was a single car, single lap, two round system where in the first round, everyone would set a time to determine positions 13–40. Then, the fastest 12 qualifiers would move on to the second round to determine positions 1–12.

Full qualifying results

Race results 
Stage 1 Laps: 30

Stage 2 Laps: 30

Stage 3 Laps: 44

Standings after the race 

Drivers' Championship standings

Note: Only the first 12 positions are included for the driver standings.

References 

2017 NASCAR Xfinity Series
NASCAR races at Daytona International Speedway
July 2017 sports events in the United States
2017 in sports in Florida